Tremont was a heritage streetcar station in Charlotte, North Carolina. The at-grade side platform, located near Tremont Avenue, was a stop for the Charlotte Trolley in the South End neighborhood.

History 
The station began operations on August 30, 1996. Consisting of a platform area along the track, the station operated Thursday through Sunday and then daily on June 28, 2004. Service was temporarily halted on February 5, 2006; during which time the station was rebuilt with an emergency call box, ramp, and shelter. When the station resumed on April 20, 2008, it operated on a limited schedule. When the Charlotte Trolley ended service on June 28, 2010, the Tremont station, along with three other trolley only stations, ceased operations. Being located within the Lynx Blue Line's right-of-way, the station's platform and shelter have remained unchanged; with the location being used for trainspotting and gathering place.

References

External links

 South End Charlotte
 Tremont station

Former Charlotte Area Transit System stations
Tremont
Railway stations in the United States opened in 1996
Railway stations closed in 2010